Ganthimathi (30 August 1940 – 9 September 2011) was a Tamil stage and film actress. She acted in over 500 films.

Early life 
Kanthimathi was born in Manamadurai in the then Ramanathapuram district of  India. She started acting in dramas and entered films at the age of eleven.

Career 
The role which got her noticed was the portrayal of Mayil's mother in 16 Vayathinile. Other important Tamil films in which she acted include Mann Vasanai, Muthu and Karagattakaran. She was awarded the Kalaimamani Award by the Government of Tamil Nadu for her contribution to Tamil cinema.

She acted as mother and grandmother almost to all actors and actresses like M.G.R, Rajinikanth, Kamalhassan, Vijaykanth, Sathyaraj, Prabhu, Vijay, Revathi, Radha, Ambika, Radhika, etc. Other actors or actresses cannot utter the non-lexical filler proverbs like "Chithada kalli viragu odaika ponalam kathala mullu kothoda kuthidichan" (When a lazy girl is forced to go for the work of cutting the firewood she may complain that aloe vera thorns poked her in a bunch) like she could.

Partial filmography

1940s

1960s

1970s

1980s

1990s

2000s

TV Series
 2004-2007 My Dear Bhootham as Moosa's Grandmother (Sun TV)
 2004-2007 Kalki   (Jaya TV)
 2005  Kolangal as Narayanan's sister  (Sun TV)
 2010-2011 Pondatti Thevai (Sun TV)

References

External links 
 

1945 births
2011 deaths
Actresses in Tamil cinema
Actresses from Tamil Nadu
People from Sivaganga district
20th-century Indian actresses
21st-century Indian actresses
Actresses in Tamil television